

December 2021

See also

References 

killings by law enforcement officers
 12